"Postmarked Birmingham" is a song recorded by American country music group Blackhawk.  It was released in October 1997 as the second single from the album Love & Gravity.  The song reached number 37 on the Billboard Hot Country Singles & Tracks chart.  The song was written by Phil Vassar and Don Sampson.

Content
The song is a mid-tempo ballad accompanied mainly by piano. In it, the narrator states that his lover has left him, and that the only "clue" she has given him is a letter that is "postmarked Birmingham".

Critical reception
A review in Billboard praised Henry Paul's lead vocal, his bandmates' harmonies, and the "understated" production, while also making note of the "direct and appealingly conversational" lyrics.

Chart performance

References

1997 singles
1997 songs
Blackhawk (band) songs
Songs written by Don Sampson
Songs written by Phil Vassar
Arista Nashville singles
Song recordings produced by Mark Bright (record producer)
Songs about Alabama